BPM 143 is the second studio album by J-pop duo Two-Mix, released by King Records on January 24, 1996. It includes the singles "Rhythm Emotion" (the second opening theme of the anime series Mobile Suit Gundam Wing) and "T-R-Y" (ending theme of the TBS sports program Super Soccer).

The album peaked at No. 5 on Oricon's weekly albums chart. It was also the duo's first album to receive Gold certification by the RIAJ.

Track listing 
All lyrics are written by Shiina Nagano; all music is composed by Minami Takayama, except where indicated; all music is arranged by Two-Mix.

Charts

Certification

References

External links 
 
 

1996 albums
Two-Mix albums
Japanese-language albums
King Records (Japan) albums